The Mixed 25 metre pistol SH1 event at the 2012 Summer Paralympics took place on 3 September at the Royal Artillery Barracks in Woolwich.

The event consisted of two rounds: a qualifier and a final. In the qualifier, each shooter fired 60 shots with a pistol at 25 metres distance from the "standing" (interpreted to include seated in wheelchairs) position. Scores for each shot are in increments of 1, with a maximum score of 10. In the qualification round groups 1-3 were shot under precision rules, 4-6 under rapid-fire rules.

The top 8 shooters in the qualifying round moved on to the final round. There, they fired an additional 20 shots. These shots scored in increments of 0.1, with a maximum score of 10.9. The total score from all 80 shots were used to determine the final ranking.

Qualification round

Q = Qualified for final. DNS = Did Not Start. * Penalised under ISSF Rule 8.6.6.1.1.1 - Too many shots fired.

Final
All qualifiers were male.

References

Shooting at the 2012 Summer Paralympics